Kotluban is a rural locality (a settlement) and the administrative center of Kotlubanskoye Rural Settlement, Gorodishchensky District, Volgograd Oblast, Russia. The population was 2,103 as of 2010. There are 40 streets.

Geography 
Kotluban is located on the left bank of the Sakarka River, 34 km northwest of Gorodishche (the district's administrative centre) by road. Varlamov is the nearest rural locality.

References 

Rural localities in Gorodishchensky District, Volgograd Oblast